The Healer is a blues album by John Lee Hooker, released in 1989 by Chameleon. The album features collaborations with Bonnie Raitt, Charlie Musselwhite, Los Lobos and Carlos Santana, among others. The album was a critical and commercial success and was important for Hooker's later career.

Background
The Healer peaked at number 62 on the Billboard 200 and "I'm in the Mood" won the Grammy Award for Best Traditional Blues Performance. The album was produced by Roy Rogers of the Delta Rhythm Kings, and executive produced by Mike Kappus, who conceived the idea for the project pairing Hooker with a variety of guest musicians. 

The video for "The Healer" featuring Carlos Santana and John Lee Hooker was filmed in the Chameleon warehouse in Hawthorne, CA amidst stacks of Hooker's old vinyl LPs, and live on stage at "The Palace," a Hollwood nightclub across from Capitol Records on Vine St. A video for "In the Mood" that featured footage of Bonnie Raitt was in rotation at MTV and VH-1, along with a video that Robert Cray appeared in for "Baby Lee".

John Lee Hooker was 73 years old when the album was released.  It was his first Grammy win and was the album that had placed highest on the Billboard charts in his forty-year career. The album had such success that it "permitted John Lee Hooker to live out the end of his life in comfort". Powers recounts with joy sending a large royalty check to Hooker, and the deep gratitude he felt for the opportunity to help him to finally achieve the recognition he deserved.

Reception

In a 2023 overview of Hooker's life and career, Tony Russell of Mojo considers this new recording of "In the Mood" a key song in Hooker's catalogue, calling it a "steamiliy erotic dialogue" with guest artist Bonnie Raitt. It was voted number 424 in the third edition of Colin Larkin's All Time Top 1000 Albums (2000).

Track listing

Personnel
Credits adapted from the album liner notes:
 John Lee Hooker – vocals, guitar, steel guitar
 Jose Areas – timbales
 Steve Berlin – saxophone
 Ndugu Chancler – drums
 Richard Cousins – bass guitar
 Robert Cray – guitar
 Steve Ehrmann – bass guitar
Jim Gaines – engineering and co-production on "The Healer"
 David Hidalgo – guitar, accordion
Sam Lehmer – engineering on all tracks except "The Healer" and "Think Twice Before You Go", mixing
 Scott Mathews – drums
 Charlie Musselwhite – harmonica
 Mike Kappus – executive producer
 Conrad Lozano – bass guitar
Mark Lynelle – engineering on "Think Twice Before You Go"
 Adolfo de la Parra – drums
 Armando Peraza – congas
 Louie Pérez – drums
 Bonnie Raitt – vocals, slide guitar
 Roy Rogers – guitar, slide guitar, production
 Cesar Rosas – guitar
 Carlos Santana – guitar and co-production on "The Healer"
 Larry Taylor – bass guitar
 Chester D. Thompson – keyboards
 George Thorogood – guitar
 Henry Vestine – guitar

Charts

Weekly charts

Year-end charts

Certifications

References

External links

 The Healer (Adobe Flash) at Radio3Net (streamed copy where licensed)

John Lee Hooker albums
1989 albums
Albums produced by Roy Rogers (guitarist)
Chameleon (label) albums
Collaborative albums